North Carolina Highway 191 (NC 191) is a primary state highway in the U.S. state of North Carolina. It travels within portions of Henderson and Buncombe Counties.

Route description
NC 191 begins at an intersection with US 25 Business / Asheville Highway in the city of Hendersonville in Henderson County. Named Haywood Road, it travels northwest from Hendersonville and enters the town of Mills River, where it meets NC 280 (Boylston Highway). The route continues north towards Asheville, leaving Henderson County and entering Buncombe County, before meeting the western terminus of NC 146 (Long Shoals Road) in the community of Avery Creek. Past Avery Creek, NC 191 intersects the scenic Blue Ridge Parkway, a National Parkway and All-American Road. The highway continues north into Venable, intersecting the eastern terminus of NC 112 (Sardis Road) and then I-26 and US 74 at exit 33 as it reaches the outermost city limits of Asheville. Entering the city, NC 191 interchanges with I-40 (exit 47) and  later, with I-26/I-240 (exit 1B). NC 191 heads into the southwestern section of Asheville named Brevard Road.

History
NC 191 is an original state highway. In 1971, the highway was routed along modern-day I-240 from Brevard Road to Haywood Road, a highway that was previously unnumbered. As a result, Brevard Road became unnumbered north of the freeway. Around 1981, NC 191 was moved back onto Brevard Road to end where it currently does at US 19 Business/US 23 Business The freeway became I-240.

Major intersections

Special routes

Asheville alternate route

North Carolina Highway 191A (NC 191A) was established as a concurrency with US 19A/US 23A along Haywood Road, between Hanover Street and Patton Avenue. The route existed only in the late 1950s.

See also

References

External links

NCRoads.com: N.C. 191
NCRoads.com: N.C. 191-A

191
Transportation in Henderson County, North Carolina
Transportation in Buncombe County, North Carolina